United National Liberation Front (in Spanish: Frente Unido de Liberación Nacional, abbreviated FULNA) was a guerrilla movement controlled by the Paraguayan Communist Party that fought against the regime of dictator Alfredo Stroessner. FULNA was founded in 1960 though by the end of the decade the movement was virtually eradicated by the Paraguayan military with its leaders and members either arrested, executed, imprisoned, tortured, or killed in action. One unit, Columna Mariscal López, continued to exist until the 1970s, when it was finally eradicated.

References

Guerrilla movements in Latin America
Paramilitary organisations based in Paraguay
Military wings of communist parties
1960 establishments in Paraguay